This is a list of earthquakes in 1996. Only earthquakes of magnitude 6 or above are included, unless they result in damage or casualties, or are notable for some other reason.  All dates are listed according to UTC time.

By death toll

By magnitude

By month

February

March

April

May

June

July

List 
 1996 Sulawesi earthquake (M7.9, Jan 1)
 1996 Lijiang earthquake (M7.0, Feb 3) 
 1996 Biak earthquake (M8.1, Feb 17) 
 1996 Chimbote earthquake (M7.4, Feb 21)
 1996 Baotou earthquake (M6.4, May 3)
 1996 Nazca earthquake (M7.5, Nov 12)

References 

1996
1996